William Booth (1776–1812) was an English farmer and forger, who was hanged for his crimes. He is the subject of the song "Twice Tried, Twice Hung, Twice Buried" by Jon Raven and a book. Several geographical features in Birmingham, near his former home, carry his name.

Early life 

Booth was born at Hall End Farm near Beaudesert, Warwickshire and was baptised at the church there on 21 February 1776. He was one of eight children of a farmer and church warden, John Booth, and his wife Mary. 

On 28 February 1799, Booth signed a 25-year lease for what became known (by 1821 if not earlier) as "Booth's Farm", including a farmhouse and 200 acres of land, part of the Perry Hall estate. The farm was then in Perry Barr, Staffordshire; that part of Perry Barr is now known as Great Barr, and is in the city of Birmingham.

Booth, then descried as a yeoman, was accused of murdering his brother John while revisiting Hall End on 19 February 1808, but was acquitted for lack of evidence.

Criminal activity 

After the Napoleonic Wars caused the government of William Pitt the Younger to order the Bank of England to restrict gold supply – the so-called "Restriction Period" – and to issue new, low-denomination, and easily-reproducible, bank notes, Booth converted the top floor of the farmhouse into a fortified workshop where he produced forgeries of those banknotes, as well as promissory notes, coins, tokens and other material of monetary value.

Once his activities came to light, a raiding party was convened on 16 March 1812, led by a constable from Birmingham, John Linwood, and comprising ten special constables and seven dragoons. 

Booth was arrested, and charged with five counts:

 "forging a 1 note, purporting to be a promissory note of the Bank of England"
 "for making paper, and having in [his] possession and using a mould for making paper, with words 'Bank of England' therein"
 "for using plates for making promissory notes in imitation of Bank of England notes, and for having blank bank notes in their possession without a written authority from the Governor and Company of the Bank of England, against Statute of 45th Geo. III."
 "for coining dollars, against the statute 44th Geo. III.—The indictment charged the prisoners with coining a piece of coin called a dollar, having an impression on the obverse side of his Majesty's head, and the words ',' and on the reverse, a figure of Britannia, and the words 'Five Shillings. Dollar. Bank of England, 1804.'"
 "for coining 3 Bank Tokens, against the Statute of 51st of his present Majesty"

Each was tried consecutively, with the same jury throughout, before Simon Le Blanc, at Stafford Assizes over two days, on 31 July and 1 August. He was found guilty on all counts and sentenced to hang.

Booth's public execution, outside Stafford jail, on 15 August 1812 was bungled, and he fell through the scaffold's trap door to the floor. Within two hours, he was hanged again and died.

He is buried in the churchyard of St Mary's, Handsworth. The inscription on his gravestone reads:

He was survived by his father, wife, sister, and two daughters, aged about fourteen, and three.

Following a change of county boundary, his body was disinterred and reburied.

A public outcry at the harshness of his sentence and others resulted in the death penalty in England and Wales being reserved for capital crimes.

Booth also minted genuine tokens as a cover for his forging activities. Several of his tokens, forgeries and printing plates are in the collection of Birmingham Museum & Art Gallery. One token is in the British Museum.

Co-conspirators 

Booth's accomplices were tried alongside him and those convicted were sentenced to transportation to Australia.

Prior to the voyage, she wrote, from the ship, at Deptford, on 8 July 1813, to the Bank of England:

and received £5 from them as it was their charitable custom to support women sentenced to transportation for forgery. She arrived at Port Jackson (now Sydney), New South Wales on 9 January 1814.

George Scot and John Yates Snr., were each sentenced to be transported for seven years. All the other defendants were acquitted. Booth's wife, who witnesses said was active in the process of making forgeries, was not charged, as wives were considered to be under the control of their husbands.

Booth's Farm 

The farmhouse was demolished in 1974, much of the farm – still known as Booth's Farm – having been sold off for housing. An archaeological excavation was conducted at that time. As late as October 1956, 45 bank tokens forged by Booth, using metal alloy instead of silver, were found in a garden on Foden Road, formerly part of the farm.

What remained of the farm became a sand and gravel quarry (the site is on Bunter Pebble Beds), and later a landfill site and eventually a nature reserve, with additional housing built in the 2010s. During the latter period, the buried foundations of the farmhouse were re-exposed and an information board placed alongside them.

Namesakes 

Booth and his farm gave their name to the still-extant Booths Lane and Booths Farm Road, now separated from each other by the M6 motorway which bisected the former farm when it opened circa 1972. In the 21st century, Forgers Walk—the pedestrian tunnel under the motorway—and later Booths Farm Walk, Booths Farm Close, Forger Lane, and Token Rise, all nearby, were so named.

Until the late 1920s, the farm was occupied by the Foden Family, commemorated in Foden Road.

The area around Booths Farm Road is known as the Booths Farm Estate.

Notes

Coordinates

References

Further reading

External links 

Picture of farmhouse

People from Great Barr
People executed for forgery
18th-century English farmers
1812 deaths
1776 births
People from Stratford-on-Avon District
People from Warwickshire (before 1974)
Executed people from Warwickshire
People executed by England and Wales by hanging
Executed people from Staffordshire
Criminals from Staffordshire
Great Barr
19th-century English farmers